Redfern Now is an Australian drama television series, that first aired on ABC1 in 2012.  The program follows the lives of 6 Aboriginal Australian families living in the urban hub of Redfern, Sydney. The series provides insight into contemporary issues facing Aboriginal Australians, including lack of employment and mental illness, which are positioned as direct ramifications of colonialisation and the Stolen Generations. Produced by Blackfella Films as part of the ABC's Indigenous Department, the show is the first series to be 'commissioned, written, acted and produced by Indigenous Australians'.  The series' release contributes to widespread public debate surrounding Indigenous representation in the Australian media.

The first season received five AACTA award nominations for 2013. The series has received numerous additional AACTA nominations, winning 5 in total, including Best Lead Actress in a Television Drama for Leah Purcell, Best Screenplay in Television, and Best Television Drama Series. 

A second season was commissioned in late 2012 and went into production in May 2013, premiering 31 October 2013. The series concluded with a telemovie titled Promise Me which aired on 9 April 2015.

Cast

 Wayne Blair as Constable Aaron Davis (2012–2015)
 Dean Daley-Jones as Indigo (2012–2015)
 Deborah Mailman as Lorraine Blake (2012–2015)
 Richard Green as Nathan (2012–2015)
 Lisa Flanagan as Allie (2012–2015)
 Kelton Pell as Raymond (2012–2015)
 Rarriwuy Hick as Robyn Davis (2012–2015)
 Kirk Page as Peter (2013–2015)
 Leah Purcell as Grace Nielson (2012–2013)
 Tessa Rose as Coral (2012–2013)
 Shari Sebbens as Julie (2012)
 Miranda Tapsell as Teneka (2012)
 Rhimi Johnson Page as Danny Blain (2012)
 Ursula Yovich as Nic Shields (2012–2013)
 Marley Sharp as Eddie Shields (2012–2013)
 Aaron McGrath as Joel "Joely" Shields (2012–2013)
 Madeleine Madden as Chloe (2012–2013)
 Stephen Curry as Constable Ryan Hobbs (2012–2013)
 Trisha Morton-Thomas as Aunty Mona (2012–2013)
 Oscar Redding as Richard (2013)
 Craig McLachlan as Jack (2013)
 Ernie Dingo as Ernie Johnson (2013)
 Steve Bisley as Richard (2013)
 Meyne Wyatt as Justin Myles (2013)
 Tammy Clarkson Jones as Mattie Erica Collinson (2013)

Series overview

Episodes

Series 1

Series 2

Telemovie

Background and production 
The ABC's Indigenous Department was founded in 2010, and headed by Aboriginal film-maker and producer Sally Riley. As director of the department, Riley aimed to create content which advocated for Aboriginal self-representation, and allowed for increased participation of Indigenous creatives in the media industry. Initial success for the department was achieved through the production of the shows First Australians and Mabo.Redfern Now took two years for the department to produce, and created more than 250 jobs for Indigenous people in the film making industry.

Sally Riley called upon British screen writer Jimmy McGovern to work on this series. McGovern's previous work which featured gritty realism and suburban life, was similar to what Riley envisioned for Redfern Now. While he was unfamiliar with Aboriginal culture, McGovern was experienced in working with marginalised communities in Britain and Ireland. The Indigenous Department of the ABC had originally aimed to a create an Aboriginal spin-off of a series that McGovern has previously worked on called The Street. Although, purchasing the rights to recreate the series proved too costly for the department, and so Riley and McGovern came up with the idea for Redfern Now.

The screen writing process itself took place over 9 months, as McGovern work shopped with five Aboriginal writers. The series was based on truth according to McGovern who said, 'the actual writing was their responsibility totally. But the shaping of the story we did together.' It was vital to him that the series was not another documentary style history or autobiography that audiences had already seen on television. With little technical experience in screen writing, key producer and writer Leah Purcell stated that McGovern's blunt feedback was 'absolutely what we needed'.

Redfern Now was directed by a group of experienced Aboriginal people in the industry including Rachel Perkins, Catriona McKenzie and Leah Purcell. Wayne Blair, the director of award-winning Australian film The Sapphires, was a particularly notable director involved in Redfern Now. Blackfella Films, which produced Redfern Now, was established in 1992 by Rachel Perkins and her then business partner Michael Riley. The organisation focuses a collaborative, ground- up approach to film and television making. The current managing director of Blackfella Films is Darren Dale.

Setting 

Inner city suburb Redfern, was an automatic choice as the setting for this ABC series. Today it is a dynamic and vibrant place, which holds great cultural significance for the Aboriginal community.

Since the 1960s Redfern has been a site for Aboriginal activism and political attention. Redfern is widely recognised as the location of then Prime Minister Paul Keating's 'Redfern Speech' in 1992. This event marked the Australian government's first public acknowledgement of the dispossession of Aboriginal people and the need for reconciliation. Redfern is also geographically in close proximity to the landing place of the first European settlers in Sydney, thus is a relevant location to be considering the impacts of colonialism on Indigenous people.

"The Block" is a particular group of houses in Redfern owned by the Aboriginal Housing Company, and is recognisable as the venue of the 2004 youth riots for Aboriginal rights. It is the main location within Redfern, where the characters in the series interact and exist with each other. 

Despite its tumultuous history, Sally Riley said Redfern is now a positive place. It has a strong Aboriginal culture, which is clear in the Indigenous art that marks the streets and parks in the suburb. Aboriginal communities put a lot of important on place, and due to the long history of Indigenous people in Redfern, it now constitutes a place of belonging for many individuals.

Theme song 
Each episode opens with the song Lonely Child, performed by Indigenous Australian musician Kira Puru, and The Bruise. The lyrics of the sombre song, 'reach out and touch me, take my hand, and walk me home', reflect dominant aspects of the storyline such as decolonisation. The song lyrics aimed to pose an atmosphere of openness for audiences, which could invite participation between Aboriginal and non-aboriginal Australian's in the process of healing.

Themes, storyline and character 
Each episode of the series introduces new characters, and explores a different social or political issue that faces Aboriginal families in urban Australia. Every episode is able to be viewed discretely, without having seen other parts of the series. While the storylines do examine the disparities between Aboriginal and non-Aboriginal Australians, Redfern Now is a fictional series that focuses on character journeys, rather than a documentary. 

Police officer Aaron Davis, played by Wayne Blair, is the only character to appear in multiple episodes throughout the series. The character encapsulates the distress that many Indigenous people experience, due to the disparity that exists between representing the needs of their Aboriginal community while also trying to abide by white cultural norms. He is a character who has 'one foot in Redfern and one foot in the outside world', according to Metro Magazine. The series is relevant in exploring the ongoing debate within urban Aboriginal communities, centring around who can be classified as Aboriginal and who cannot be. This is salient in relation to character Julie, played by Shari Sebbens. The character is complimented on not looking Aboriginal, despite living with her Indigenous family in Redfern.

Despite these dark and confronting storylines, the series is interspersed with intentional moments of humour. According to screenwriter McGovern, these are essential to keeping the viewer engaged in content that could so easily become alienating. The comedic side of the show stems from Aboriginal culture, where people are intent of finding 'humour in adversity'.

Aboriginal representation in film and television 

Redfern Now has been 'ground breaking', because of how it confronts the historical way that Aboriginality has been defined on television.

Australia's distinct colonial history means that representations of Aboriginal people on television screens have traditionally been distorted and tokenistic, and contributed to perpetuating racist cultural stereotypes. This results from non-Aboriginal people historically being positioned behind the camera as storywriters, producers and directors, who objectify Aboriginal actors in front of the camera. There has been a clear distinction between the authors and subjects of creative works.

The concept of Aboriginality itself is a dynamic 'social thing', that is shaped through intercultural experiences and dialogue between non-indigenous and Indigenous Australians. As Aboriginal scholar Marcia Langton suggests, the predominant interactions that non-aboriginal audiences have with Aboriginal people is through what they observe on television. So, it is essential that these representations are authentic and do not convey colonial tropes.

The 1991 National Inquiry into Racist Violence, conducted by the Human Rights and Equal Opportunity Commission, expressed concerns about the lack of diversity on Australian Screens and encouraged increased recruitment of Indigenous people in the media industry. Since then, representation has improved so that while Aboriginal people make up 3% of the Australian population, they make up 5% of people in Australian television dramas. Departments such as the government funded Screen Australia, and the ABC's Indigenous Department, have been dedicated to leading the way in improving diverse representation.

Redfern Now is centred around an Aboriginal community, as opposed to previous representations on television where Aboriginal people are cast as the friend or supporting actor. Aboriginal directors, producers and writers worked on the series, meaning that characters could 'play roles written by them, not for them'. Scholar Felicity Collins believes that it is these genuine representations which create an atmosphere of openness, that allow for audience engagement in the process of intercultural dialogue.

Since Redfern Now, the ABC's Indigenous department have created other comedies and dramas of a similar nature. Shows like The Gods of Wheat Street (2014), Black Comedy (2014), 8MMM (2015), and Cleverman (2016) were inspired by the success of Redfern Now.

Reception 
The series has generally received critical praise. Of the first episode Melinda Houston of The Age said, "It makes for television that works on every level: as an important cultural contribution, as a vehicle for sensational actors, writers, directors and technicians, as a great conversation-starter and as a fabulous piece of drama." Based on the second episode, Bob Ellis writes, "It was very well done indeed, and the mixture, like Obama's Dreams From My Father, of honesty, eloquence and hope, bids fair... for a series outcome that may well be seen, in sum, hereafter, as a classic." After viewing the third episode, the television writer for The Canberra Times writes, "Redfern Now is probably as important as any drama produced this year. This is really mature and clever storytelling with the strangest taste of an old O. Henry morality tale."

Redfern Now received criticism from some conservative commentators. They questioned the shows separation of the identity of Aboriginal people living in urban settings, from the perceived 'authentic' rural Aboriginal identity.

Generally feedback received was overwhelmingly positive, with The Sydney Morning Herald calling the first airing a 'landmark moment' for Australian television. Metro Magazine noted that the themes explored did not appear like tokenistic tropes, as they often have on other shows which explore Aboriginal issues. They reviewed that the dark themes only existed in the background, and at the foreground were deep character explorations which assisted in presenting a rich and diverse culture. The show did not appear overly political, because of a greater focus on domestic, emotive scenes.

The series received 7.9/10 stars on IMDb. The Guardian awarded the final telemovie 4/5 stars, stating that 'it will be missed, but the series concludes at the peak of its power.'

The series was bought by Netflix for certain regions. It has resonated with international audiences, being sold to France Televisions.

Graham Blundell, Australian actor and writer, admitted to expecting 'something grim and grey in tone' for a series set in Redfern. Instead, he noted in a review that the series was 'stylised and quite beautiful to look at'. Cinematographers Mark Wareham and Jules O'Loughlin have presented Redfern as a bright, sensory and vibrant place. Attributing to this sense of Redfern as a multidimensional place, is the diverse settings which includes schools, homes, streets, alleys and cafes.

See also 
 Blackstone a Canadian television program with a similar theme.

Awards and nominations

References

External links 
  @ the ABC. There are behind the scenes snippets for all episodes here.
 

2012 Australian television series debuts
2012 Australian television series endings
APRA Award winners
Indigenous Australian television series
Australian Broadcasting Corporation original programming
Australian drama television series
English-language television shows
Redfern, New South Wales